The European Renju Championship is an official Renju championship organized by the Renju International Federation (RIF). It was started in 1994.

History 
The first European Championship was held in 1994 in Tallinn, Estonia. In 1995, it was decided by the General Assembly of the Renju International Federation (RIF) that the European Championships would be held regularly. In the same year, the 2nd European Championship was held in Saint Petersburg, Russia. Since 1996, the European Championship was changed to happen once every two years.

Tournament system 
Over the years, the tournament was held in different ways. In 1994 and 1995, the Swiss system was used. In 1996, there were two groups, after which the winner was determined by the semifinal and final matches. A similar regulation with only one group was applied until 2002. From then, the Swiss system was used in a long time. In 2016, a round-robin system with final matches was applied.

Places and winners

References

European championships
Renju competitions